Els Arcs is a locality located in the municipality of Bellvís, in Province of Lleida province, Catalonia, Spain. As of 2020, it has a population of 142.

Geography 
Els Arcs is located 33km east-northeast of Lleida.

References

Populated places in the Province of Lleida